Saddleback Mountain is a mountain near Kiama in the Illawarra region of New South Wales, Australia.

Location and features
When viewed from Kiama and Shellharbour it has a distinctive saddle-shaped peak and is connected to the southernmost tip of the Illawarra Escarpment (though the escarpment itself continues into Kangaroo Valley), Noorinan Mountain by a high ridge, on which is Hoddles Track, built by early surveyor Hoddle and which once stretched from Bowral to Kiama before a more suitable route was found quickly over the escarpment. This section goes to the edge of Barren Grounds Plateau (Noorinan Mountain) but does not allow access into the Barren Grounds reserve. An offshoot track goes to Foxground to the south of Noorinan Mountain promontory.

Its summit is reached by Saddleback Mountain Road, which goes from Kiama to the summit via a steep turn-off from the main road. This section is often used by walkers and cars but buses are not allowed due to the risk. Saddleback lookout, near the electric towers on the summit and the western and southern lookouts, has fine views and is popular with tourists and motorists who drive up the winding picturesque road to the summit which passed dairy country common in the area. The lookout is on a wooden projected deck, with fine views of Noorinan Mountain, Knights Hill, Lake Illiawarra, Stockyard Mountain and other features of the plain. The chimneys of Port Kembla stand out near the horizon. The west lookout looks to Noorinan Mountain promontory and at the Barren Grounds Plateau, and, to the south, Fox Mountain, Mount Coolangatta and the Shoalhaven River.

The foothills go down to Kiama and Gerringong and the sea and down to Jamberoo Valley and the Minnamurra River. The entire area was once covered by a subtropical rainforest known as the Illawarra Scrub but is now restricted to a small area around the summit lookout. The foothills include much dairy farming, and many historic dry walls remain. On the eastern ridge of the mountain is Saddleback House and in the northern foothills is Jerrara Dam, the region's first water supply, built in the 19th century. Just north of the summit is a second peak, lesser known, called Mount Brandon.

It is a collapsed volcanic vent.

See also

 List of mountains of New South Wales
 No. 18 Radar Station RAAF, sited during World War II
 Hoddles Track

References

Illawarra escarpment
Wollongong
Mountains of New South Wales
Tourist attractions in New South Wales
Municipality of Kiama